Tamara Margaret Finkelstein  (born 24 May 1967) is a British civil servant who is currently the permanent secretary at the Department for Environment, Food and Rural Affairs.

Early life and education 
Tamara Margaret Finkelstein was born on 24 May 1967 to the academic Ludwik Finkelstein and the Holocaust survivor and educator Mirjam Finkelstein. She has two brothers, the journalist and politician Daniel Finkelstein and the software engineer and civil servant Anthony Finkelstein, and her grandfather was Alfred Wiener.

She was educated at Haberdashers' Aske's School for Girls before studying engineering science at Balliol College, Oxford, graduating in 1989 and economics at the London School of Economics, graduating in 1992.

Career 
Finkelstein joined HM Treasury in 1992 as an economic adviser. She became private secretary and speechwriter to the Chancellor of the Exchequer in 1997 and a senior adviser in 2000. She served as deputy director for Sure Start from 2001 to 2004 before holding a number of director roles.

After 22 years at the Treasury, she joined the Department of Health in 2014 as the Chief Operating Officer and a director-general. In the aftermath of the Grenfell Tower fire, she led the establishment of the building safety programme at the Department of Communities and Local Government. In 2018, she joined the Department for Environment, Food and Rural Affairs as director-general for EU Exit Delivery, and succeeded Clare Moriarty as the permanent secretary in 2019.

Finkelstein has been a trustee for the charity Norwood since 2018.

Honours 
Finkelstein was appointed Companion of the Order of the Bath (CB) in the 2020 New Year Honours for public service.

References

External links 
 Finkelstein's page on gov.uk
 

Living people
1967 births
Civil servants in the Ministry of Health (United Kingdom)
Place of birth missing (living people)
British economists
Permanent Under-Secretaries of State for Environment, Food and Rural Affairs
Civil servants in HM Treasury
Companions of the Order of the Bath
People educated at Haberdashers' Girls' School
Alumni of Balliol College, Oxford
Alumni of the London School of Economics
British people of German-Jewish descent